Charles Holloway may refer to:

 Charles Holloway (cricketer) (1789–1846), English professional cricketer
 Sir Charles Holloway (engineer) (1749–1827), major-general in the Royal Engineers
 Charles Holloway (stage) (1848–1908), Australian actor and manager
 Charles A. Holloway, American professor and business executive
 Charles E. Holloway (died 1962), namesake for Camp Holloway

See also
 Charles Holloway James (1893–1953), British architect